Nigeria Taekwondo Federation is a member of the African umbrella organization African Taekwondo Union (ATU) as well as the World Association for World Taekwondo (WT).

On the part of the Nigeria Olympic Committee, the NOC is the only Taekwondo Association authorized to send athletes to the Olympic Games.

References

External links
Official website

Taekwondo organizations
Taekwondo
National members of World Taekwondo
Taekwondo in Nigeria
National Taekwondo teams